Cisie may refer to the following places in Poland:
Cisie, Lesser Poland Voivodeship (south Poland)
Cisie, Mińsk County in Masovian Voivodeship (east-central Poland)
Cisie, Wołomin County in Masovian Voivodeship (east-central Poland)